This is a list of all episodes of The PJs.

Series overview

Episodes

Season 1 (1999)

Season 2 (2000)

Season 3 (2000–01)

External links
 

PJs
PJs